Heartstopper (also known as Heart Stopper) is a 2006 straight-to-DVD horror film directed by Bob Keen and starring Robert Englund, Meredith Henderson, and Nathan Stephenson.

Plot
Sara Wexler is a lonely teenager who attempts to commit suicide by running in front of a car. However, she is only injured before being discovered by Sheriff Berger. He takes her to hospital, where the notorious serial killer Jonathan Chambers, whom Berger captured, is being detained. Chambers is then executed in the electric chair, but the police do not know that he survived by making a deal with the devil. Chambers now has supernatural powers and begins to slaughter everyone in the hospital, including Berger. Meanwhile, Sara and another teenager called Walter, who was sent to hospital after accidentally being impaled on his own rake, try to escape from the hospital but find that all exits are locked. Chambers then confronts Sara and explains that he needs her to help him because she has a power which will make him immortal. She declines the offer and flees from him. Eventually she defeats Chambers by opening a portal to hell and sending him through it. In the final scene, however, it is revealed that Chambers's personality has passed into her.

Cast

Production
Filming lasted from 9 September 2005 to 13 November 2005, on a $3,000,000 budget.

Release
The film was released on DVD in the United States on 31 October 2006 and in the UK on 18 December 2006.

References

External links
 
 

2006 horror films
2006 films
Canadian horror films
English-language Canadian films
2000s English-language films
2000s Canadian films